Walter David Counts III (born 1961) is a United States district judge of the United States District Court for the Western District of Texas. He was formerly a United States magistrate judge of the same court.

Biography 

Counts received a Bachelor of Arts degree in 1983 from Texas Tech University. He received a Juris Doctor in 1986 from St. Mary's University School of Law. He began his legal career as an associate at the law firm of Martin, Cox, Greenberg & Jones. From 1987 to 1995, he served as an Assistant District Attorney for the Travis County District Attorney's Office, with the exception of a six-month period from 1990 to 1991, when he worked as a solo practitioner. From 1995 to 2009, he served as an Assistant United States Attorney for the Western District of Texas. Concurrently with his other service, Counts has served in the Texas National Guard since 1986, serving as a State Judge Advocate since 2006. He currently holds the rank of colonel.

Federal judicial service

Expired district court nomination under Obama 

From 2009 to 2017, Counts served as a United States magistrate judge of the United States District Court for the Western District of Texas. On March 15, 2016, President Barack Obama nominated Counts to serve as a United States District Judge of the United States District Court for the Western District of Texas, to the seat vacated by Judge Robert A. Junell, who assumed senior status on February 13, 2015. On September 7, 2016, a hearing before the Senate Judiciary Committee was held on his nomination. His nomination expired on January 3, 2017, with the end of the 114th Congress.

Renomination to district court under Trump 

His renomination was announced on September 7, 2017. On September 11, 2017, his nomination was officially sent to the Senate. He was renominated to the same seat. On October 26, 2017, his nomination was reported out of committee by a voice vote.  On January 11, 2018, the United States Senate invoked cloture on his nomination by a 90–1 vote. Counts was confirmed later that day by a 96–0 vote. He received his judicial commission on January 17, 2018.

See also 
 Barack Obama judicial appointment controversies

References

External links 
 
 

1961 births
Living people
20th-century American lawyers
21st-century American judges
Assistant United States Attorneys
Judges of the United States District Court for the Western District of Texas
National Guard (United States) colonels
People from Knox City, Texas
Recipients of the Legion of Merit
St. Mary's University School of Law alumni
Texas lawyers
Texas National Guard personnel
Texas Tech University alumni
United States magistrate judges
United States district court judges appointed by Donald Trump